Switzerland competed at the 2017 World Games in Wroclaw, Poland, from July 20, 2017 to July, 30 2017.

Competitors

Gymnastic

Trampoline
Switzerland has qualified at the 2017 World Games:

Women's Synchronized Trampoline - 1 quota

Snooker
Alexander Ursenbacher has qualified at the 2017 World Games

Fistball
Switzerland has qualified at the 2017 World Games in the Fistball Men Team event.

Tug of war 

Switzerland won the gold medal in the men's outdoor 700 kg event and the silver medal in the men's outdoor 640 kg event.

References 

Nations at the 2017 World Games
2017 in Swiss sport
2017